Thorsten Jonsson (1910–1950) was a Swedish writer, journalist and translator.

Jonsson grew up in a small village in Västerbotten. He studied at Stockholms högskola and then worked as journalist for various newspapers, including Dagens Nyheter. In 1943 he became Dagens Nyheters correspondent in United States. A selection of his articles as a correspondent were published in the book Sidor av Amerika in 1946.

Jonsson was praised for his translations of American writers like Ernest Hemingway and John Steinbeck and wrote several essays on contemporary American literature. Six studies were published in the book Sex amerikaner: Hemingway, Faulkner, Steinbeck, Caldwell, Farrell, Saroyan in 1942.

As a writer he published two books of poems, two short story collections and the acclaimed novel Konvoj, published in 1947. Dimman från havet, a book of four stories set in America, an essay collection and his collected short stories were published posthumously.

Bibliography
Utflykt, 1933
Stor-Norrland och litteraturen, 1938
Som ett träd, 1939
Som det brukar vara, 1939
Martin Koch, 1941
Fly till vatten och morgon, 1941
Sex amerikaner: Hemingway, Faulkner, Steinbeck, Caldwell, Farrell, Saroyan, 1942
Sidor av Amerika: Intryck och resonemang, 1946
Konvoj, 1947
Dimman från havet, 1950
Synpunkter, 1951
Noveller, 1955
Berättelser från Amerika, 2007

Translations (selected)
A. J. Cronin Citadellet (The Citadel), 1938
Ernest Hemingway Att ha och inte ha (To Have and Have Not), 1939
John Steinbeck Vredens druvor (The Grapes of Wrath), 1940
Ernest Hemingway Klockan klämtar för dig (For Whom the Bell Tolls), 1940
Daniel Defoe Robinson Crusoe, 1942
Ernest Hemingway Snön på Kilimandjaro och andra noveller (The Snows of Kilimanjaro), 1942
Erskine Caldwell Avlöning vid Savannah River (Savannah River Payday), 1942
John Steinbeck Den långa dalen (The Long Valley), 1943
John Steinbeck Månen har gått ned (The Moon is Down), 1943
Dylan Thomas En varm lördag (One Warm Saturday), 1943
e. e. cummings poems, included in Sidor av Amerika, 1946
Mörk sång: Fyrtiofem amerikanska negerdikter (anthology of afroamerican poetry), 1949

References
Thorsten Jonsson Riksarkivet
Jonsson Thorsten Jonsson Svenskt översättarlexikon

Swedish novelists
Swedish short story writers
Swedish poets
Swedish translators
1910 births
1950 deaths
20th-century Swedish journalists
20th-century translators